Basem Eid (born March 13, 1990) is an Egyptian footballer (soccer) defender.

External links
 
 

1990 births
Living people
Egyptian footballers
Association football defenders
Aswan SC players
Al Ittihad Alexandria Club players